Yuriy Pleshakov (29 August 1988 – 22 November 2020) was a Ukrainian (until 2014) and Russian football forward.

Notes

External links 
 
 
 

1988 births
2020 deaths
Sportspeople from Sevastopol
Ukrainian footballers
Ukrainian footballers banned from domestic competitions
Russian footballers
Ukrainian Premier League players
Naturalised citizens of Russia
Association football forwards
Ukrainian expatriate footballers
Expatriate footballers in Belarus
FC Metalist Kharkiv players
FC Sevastopol players
FC Belshina Bobruisk players
FC Desna Chernihiv players
FC Stal Kamianske players
FC Sevastopol (Russia) players
Crimean Premier League players